Lawrence R. "Larry" Alexander (June 10, 1950 – November 6, 2012) was an American politician and lawyer.

Born on June 10, 1950, in Gardner, Massachusetts, Alexander received his bachelor's degree from Yale University and his Juris Doctor degree from Boston University School of Law. He was a member of the Massachusetts bar. Alexander wrote newspaper articles and a novel. He served in the Massachusetts House of Representatives from 1979 to 1991 as a Democrat.

See also
 1979–1980 Massachusetts legislature
 1981–1982 Massachusetts legislature
 1983–1984 Massachusetts legislature
 1985–1986 Massachusetts legislature
 1987–1988 Massachusetts legislature
 1989–1990 Massachusetts legislature
 Massachusetts House of Representatives' 8th Essex district

References

External links
 

1950 births
2012 deaths
People from Gardner, Massachusetts
Boston University School of Law alumni
Massachusetts lawyers
Democratic Party members of the Massachusetts House of Representatives
Writers from Massachusetts
20th-century American lawyers